Piero Vida (5 August 1938 – 1987) was an Italian film actor. He appeared in 52 films between 1959 and 1987. He was born in Venice, Italy and died in Rome, Italy.

Partial filmography

 Il raccomandato di ferro (1959)
 Katarsis (1963) - Padre Peo Remigio
 Chi lavora è perduto (1963) - Gianni - L'amico di Bonifacio
 Slalom (1965) - The Murderer
 La donnaccia (1965)
 Una questione privata (1966)
 Pecos Cleans Up (1967) - Paco
 Renegade Riders (1967) - Levasseur
 Odio per odio (1967) - Sorito
 John the Bastard (1967) - Sacerdote
 Execution (1968) - Burd
 Trusting Is Good... Shooting Is Better (1968) - The Portuguese
 Galileo (1968) - Pope Urban VIII
 Il sole è di tutti (1968)
 Catch as Catch Can (1968)
 Sai cosa faceva Stalin alle donne? (1969) - Director
 Sierra Maestra (1969)
 Capricci (1969, by Carmelo Bene) - Policeman
 Nel nome del padre (1971) - Bestia
 Short Night of Glass Dolls (1971) - Kommissar Kierkoff
 Il sindacalista (1972) - Vezio Bellinelli
 Who Saw Her Die? (1972) - Journalist Cuman
 Le notti peccaminose di Pietro l'Aretino (1972) - Cuor contento
 Beati i ricchi (1972) - Prete
 Salome (1972) - Narraboth
 Testa in giù, gambe in aria (1972)
 Fiorina la vacca (1972) - Nane 'ruffiano'
 Non ho tempo (1973)
 Sentivano uno strano, eccitante, pericoloso puzzo di dollari (1973) - Bronco Kid
 Giordano Bruno (1973)
 Furto di sera bel colpo si spera (1973)
 Patroclooo!... e il soldato Camillone, grande grosso e frescone (1973) - Ottavio
 Buona parte di Paolina (1973)
 The Night Porter (1974) - Day Porter
 Anno uno (1974) - Clienti al caffè
 E cominciò il viaggio nella vertigine (1974) - Prof. Nikeli Vaks
 Deep Red (1975) - Fat cop
 Leonor (1975)
 A Genius, Two Partners and a Dupe (1975) - Jacky Roll
 Marcia trionfale (1976)
 Giovannino (1976)
 1900 (1976)
 Disubbidire è peccato (1976)
 Tough to Kill (1979)
 Il ritorno di Casanova (1980)
 The Lady of the Camellias (1981)
 Grog (1982)
 Cicciabomba (1982) - Don Lillo
 Nostalgia (1983)
 Il cavaliere, la morte e il diavolo (1983)
 Les amants terribles (1985) - Patron De La Trattoria
 Massimamente folle (1985)
 La vita di scorta (1986)
 Il camorrista (1986) - Mimmo Mesillo
 The Moro Affair (1986) - Secretary of the PSI
 Stage Fright (1987) - Ferrari
 Man on Fire (1987) - Kidnapper

External links

1938 births
1987 deaths
Italian male film actors
20th-century Italian male actors